Forbes is an unincorporated community in Saint Louis County, Minnesota, United States.

The community is located 10 miles southwest of the city of Eveleth at the junction of Saint Louis County Highway 7 and County Highway 16.

Forbes is located along the boundary line between Clinton Township and McDavitt Township.

State Highway 37 (MN 37) and U.S. Highway 53 are both nearby. The Saint Louis River is in the vicinity.

References

 Rand McNally Road Atlas – 2007 edition – Minnesota entry
 Official State of Minnesota Highway Map – 2011/2012 edition

Unincorporated communities in Minnesota
Unincorporated communities in St. Louis County, Minnesota
Mining communities in Minnesota